The Guns of Loos is a 1928 British silent war film directed by Sinclair Hill and starring Henry Victor, Madeleine Carroll, and Bobby Howes.

Plot
A blind veteran of the First World War returns home to run his family's industrial empire.

Cast

 Henry Victor as John Grimlaw
 Madeleine Carroll as Diana Cheswick 
 Bobby Howes as Danny
 Hermione Baddeley as Mavis
 Donald Macardle as Clive
 Adeline Hayden Coffin as Lady Cheswick
 Jeanne le Vaye as Arlette
 Philip Hewland as Stevens
 Frank Goldsmith as Colonel Jameson
 Tom Coventry as Tubby
 William Freshman as Officer
 Wally Patch as Sergeant
 Daniel Laidlaw VC as himself

Production background
Carroll was selected for the role from 150 applicants to play her role. It was her first film role and helped launch her career.

Daniel Laidlaw, an army piper who won the Victoria Cross while rallying his company at the 1915 Battle of Loos, plays himself.

Score
In 2011, sheet music for Richard Howgill's score, meant to be performed live as the film was projected, was rediscovered in Birmingham Central Library.

Notes

References
 Kelly, Andrew (1998). Filming All Quiet on the Western Front. I.B. Tauris & Co.
 Wise, James E. Jr.; Baron, Scott (2002). International Stars at War. Annapolis, MD: Naval Institute Press. .

External links
 

1928 films
British war films
British silent feature films
Stoll Pictures films
1920s English-language films
Films directed by Sinclair Hill
Films set in the 1910s
Films set in England
British World War I films
British black-and-white films
1928 war films
Silent war films
1920s British films